Rolf Sorg is an entrepreneur, founder and chairman of PM-International AG.

As a student Sorg started with direct sales of cosmetic products. In 1993 the company he worked for had to file for bankruptcy and Sorg used his savings to found PM-International, followed by the holding company in Luxembourg one year later. In 1995 he expanded the product range to include dietary supplements. Since 2015 the international headquarters of the company is located in Schengen, Luxembourg.

In 2013 Sorg sued Google for violation of his personal rights by adding search queries. He won the case before the German Federal Court of Justice. Sorg has lived in Luxembourg since 1998 and has the Luxembourg citizenship. He is married to Vicki Sorg, who is also active in the company as a charity ambassador. Sorg is father of 2 children.

In 2014, Sorg was named one of the Entrepreneurs of the Year by the German publication Manager Magazin. In 2022, his company was ranked 9th in the Direct Selling News Global 100 list.

References

External links 
 Official Website PM-International

1963 births
Living people

German businesspeople

Direct selling
German founders